This is a list of notable artists signed by Bad Taste, and have Wikipedia articles.

Artists

A 

Ásgerður Júníusdóttir
Atli Heimir Sveinsson

B 

Bellatrix aka Kolrassa Krókríðandi
Björk
Bogomil Font
Borko
Botnleðja

D 

Daníel Bjarnason
Didda
Dikta

E 

Eberg
Egill Ólafsson
Einar Örn Benediktsson
Emilíana Torrini

F 

Fræbbblarnir

G 

Gabríela Friðriksdóttir
GusGus

H 

HAM
Haukur Tómasson
Hilmar Örn Hilmarsson
Hljómar

J 

Jagúar
Jóhann Jóhannsson

K 

Kimono

L 

Lárus H Grímsson
Lárus Sigurðsson
Leaves

M 

Magnús Blöndal Jóhannsson
Maus
Megas
Mínus
Mugison
Mammút.

P 

Paul Óscar
Pax
Purrkur Pillnikk.

Q 

Q4U
Quarashi.

R 

Risaeðlan aka Reptile

S 

Sigur Rós
Singapore Sling
Sjón
Skakkamanage
Ske
Skúli Sverrisson
Slowblow
Spoon
Stafrænn Hakon
Steindor Andersen
Sveinbjörn Beinteinsson

T 

The Hamrahlid Choir
The Sugarcubes
Tómas R. Einarsson
Trabant
Trúbrot
TV Pow.

U 

Unun
Utangarðsmenn.

Þ 

Þeyr
Þór's Hammer
Þorkell Sigurbjörnsson.

See also 
 List of record labels
 Bad Taste

External links
 Official site

Bad Taste
Icelandic music